Brother Jonathan is an iconic figure and emblem of the states of New England.

Brother Jonathan may also refer to:
 Brother Jonathan (newspaper), a periodical published in New York City that stopped publication during the Civil War
 Brother Jonathan (steamer), an ocean vessel known for regularly rounding Cape Horn

See also
 Jonathan (1 Samuel), the best friend of King David of Israel
 My Brother Jonathan, a 1948 British film starring Michael Denison